Eva Berková (born 23 October 1965) is a Slovak basketball player. She competed in the women's tournament at the 1988 Summer Olympics and the 1992 Summer Olympics.

References

1965 births
Living people
Slovak women's basketball players
Olympic basketball players of Czechoslovakia
Basketball players at the 1988 Summer Olympics
Basketball players at the 1992 Summer Olympics
Sportspeople from Bratislava